Matejić may refer to:

 Matejić Monastery
 Matejić (surname)